2015–16 NCAA Division I women's ice hockey rankings 

Two polls make up the 2015–16 NCAA Division I women's ice hockey rankings, the USCHO.com/CBS College Sports poll and the USA Today/USA Hockey Magazine poll. As the 2015–16 season progresses, rankings are updated weekly.

USCHO

USA Today

References

External links
USCHO.com Division I Women's Poll
USA Today/USA Hockey Magazine Women's College Hockey Poll

2015–16 NCAA Division I women's hockey season
College women's ice hockey rankings in the United States